Ernst Arndt (3 February 1861 – ) was a German stage and film actor notable for his later career in Austria.

Life
Arndt was born in Magdeburg, Germany.  From 1910 he was a member of the Burgretheater ensemble in Vienna. He also made occasional appearances in supporting roles in films. On 13 March 1931, he was made an Honorary Citizen of Vienna.

On 10 July 1942, at the age of 81, he was deported to the Theresienstadt Ghetto, and from there on 23 September of the same year to Treblinka extermination camp, where he is presumed to have been murdered shortly afterward.

Filmography
 Herbstzauber (1918, directed by Emil Albes, Germany) as agricultural labourer
 Der Umweg zur Ehe (1919, directed by Fritz Freisler, Germany) as Joe Castor
 Seine Durchlaucht der Landstreicher (1919, directed by Paul L. Stein, Austria)
 Licht und Schatten (1919, directed by Artur Holz, Austria)
 A Vanished World (1922, directed by Alexander Korda, Austria)
 Samson und Delila (1922, directed by Alexander Korda, Austria) as impresario
 The Prince of Arcadia (1932, directed by Karl Hartl, Austria)
 Die grausame Freundin (1932, directed by Carl Lamač, Germany) as Professor Bierbrot
 Gently My Songs Entreat (1933, directed by Willi Forst, Germany / Austria) (uncredited)
 When You're Young, the World Belongs to You (1934, directed by Henry Oebels, Austria) as village organist
 Bretter, die die Welt bedeuten (1935, directed by Kurt Gerron, Austria ) as Seifert, Katja's uncle (final film role)

External links
 
  https://www.filmportal.de/person/ernst-arndt_66903460b962492a9b89c267661a6a9e Filmportal.de: filmography]
 Cyranos.ch: photo and biographical summary

1861 births
1942 deaths
Austrian male silent film actors
20th-century Austrian male actors
German male film actors
German male silent film actors
German emigrants to Austria-Hungary
German people who died in Treblinka extermination camp
German civilians killed in World War II
Actors  from Magdeburg
People from the Province of Saxony
Male actors from Vienna
Theresienstadt Ghetto prisoners
20th-century German male actors
German male stage actors
Austrian male stage actors
German people executed in Nazi concentration camps